William Charles "Wick" Powell (1905–1973) was a Welsh international rugby union scrum-half who played club rugby for London Welsh and county rugby for Middlesex. Powell was a powerful passer whose speciality was the reverse pass, though he is often remembered for his varying displays for his country that sometimes would lose as much as win games.

Rugby career
Powell first came to note when at the age of 16 was invited to tour with invitational team Crawshays. While 16, and as a Welsh Guardsman, he turned out for the Army XV. He left the army to qualify as an architect, and in 1926, while playing for London Welsh, he was brought into the Welsh squad against Scotland. Although Wales lost the match 8–5, Powell was hailed as a success as he appeared to complete his task of subduing Scotland's Ian Smith, who had scored seven tries in his last two games against Wales. Powell later captained Wales on two occasions, the first time against France in 1927, on only his fifth cap. He captained Wales again the next match against Ireland, but although his last captaincy he represented Wales 27 times until 1935.

International matches played
Wales
 1927, 1929, 1931, 1932, 1935
 1926, 1927, 1928, 1929, 1930, 1931
  1926, 1927, 1928, 1929, 1930, 1931, 1932, 1935
 1931
 1926, 1928, 1929, 1930, 1931, 1932, 1935

Bibliography

References 

1905 births
1973 deaths
Abertillery RFC players
Barbarian F.C. players
Crawshays RFC players
London Welsh RFC players
Rugby union players from Aberbeeg
Wales international rugby union players
Wales rugby union captains
Welsh Guards soldiers
Welsh rugby union players
Rugby union scrum-halves